USS Cushing (Destroyer No. 55/DD-55) was an  built for the United States Navy prior to the American entry into World War I. The ship was the second U.S. Navy vessel named in honor of William B. Cushing, a U.S. Navy officer best known for sinking the Confederate ironclad warship  during the American Civil War.

Cushing was laid down by the Fore River Shipbuilding Company of Quincy, Massachusetts, in September 1913 and launched in January 1915. She was armed with four  guns and had eight 21 inch (533 mm) torpedo tubes.
			
After her August 1915 commissioning, Cushing sailed off the east coast and in the Caribbean. After the United States entered World War I in April 1917, Cushing was sent overseas to patrol the Irish Sea out of Queenstown, Ireland. Cushing made several unsuccessful attacks on U-boats, and rescued survivors of several ships sunk by the German craft.

Upon returning to the United States after the war, Cushing was placed in reserve in reduced commission. She was decommissioned at Philadelphia in August 1920. She was struck from the Naval Vessel Register in January 1936 and sold for scrapping in June.

Design and construction 
Construction of the vessel was awarded to the Fore River Shipbuilding Company of Quincy, Massachusetts, which laid down her keel on 23 September 1913. On 16 January 1915, Cushing was launched by sponsor Miss M. L. Cushing, daughter of the ship's namesake, William B. Cushing. The ship was the second ship named for Cushing, a U.S. Navy officer best known for sinking the Confederate ironclad warship  during the American Civil War.

Cushing had two Zoelly steam turbines that drove her two screw propellers, and an additional pair triple-expansion steam engines, each connected to one of the propeller shafts, for cruising purposes.

Cushing was also equipped with eight  torpedo tubes. The General Board of the United States Navy had called for two anti-aircraft guns for the O'Brien-class ships, as well as provisions for laying up to 36 floating mines. From sources, it is unclear if these recommendations were followed for Cushing or any of the other ships of the class.

Early career 
USS Cushing was commissioned into the United States Navy on 21 August 1915 under the command of Lieutenant Commander T. A. Kittinger. Cushing served on the Neutrality patrol off Rose Bank, New York, until 28 December 1915. She sailed to the Caribbean for fleet maneuvers on 4 January 1916 and after joining in fleet tactical exercises off Portland, Maine, and gunnery exercises off Norfolk, Virginia, she reported to Newport, Rhode Island, on 27 September to test torpedoes at the Naval Torpedo Station.

At 05:30 on Sunday, 8 October 1916, wireless reports came in of a German submarine stopping ships near the Lightship Nantucket, off the eastern end of Long Island. After an SOS from the British steamer West Point was received at about 12:30, Rear Admiral Albert Gleaves ordered Cushing and other destroyers at Newport to attend to survivors. The American destroyers arrived on the scene about 17:00 when the U-boat,  under the command of Kapitänleutnant Hans Rose, was in the process of stopping the Holland-America Line cargo ship . Shortly after, U-53 stopped the British passenger ship . After Rose had given passengers and crew aboard both ships adequate time to abandon them, he sank the pair. In total, 226 survivors from U-53s five victims were rescued by the destroyer flotilla.

After finishing out the rest of 1916 at Newport, Cushing again joined in exercises in the Caribbean for the first three months of 1917.

World War I 
The destroyers arrived at Queenstown, Ireland, 24 May for duty in the war zone.

Cushing patrolled off the Irish coast, meeting and escorting convoys of merchant ships and troop transports to British ports and the French coast. German submarines were active in the area and Cushing conducted antisubmarine patrols and performed rescue work on the ships that were victims of U-boats. On 4 June, she picked up 13 men adrift in a small boat, survivors of Italian brig Luisa.

The destroyer had a busy July. On the 7th, she assisted  in rescuing survivors of the torpedoed and sinking British merchant ship SS Tarquah. The next day she responded to an SOS from SS Onitsha, which was being chased by an enemy submarine, and picked up 54 survivors of SS Obuasi which had already been sunk.

On 12 September, five survivors from the British SS Vienna were saved after being adrift for 2 days. On 26 November, when RFA Crenella was torpedoed, Cushing stood by, giving damage control assistance which kept the merchantman from sinking, then escorted her into Queenstown. Cushing rejoined her convoy the next day. Continuing her convoy escort and patrol duty, Cushing on 25 April 1918 dropped fifteen depth charges on German submarine , damaging her severely;  sank U-104 later that same day. After 11 June 1918, Cushing operated from Brest, France, escorting eleven troop convoys through the submarine zones into French ports, making two depth charge attacks without success in the process.

Postwar 
Immediately after the Armistice was signed on 11 November 1918, Cushing remained in French waters. She towed , which had grounded on rocks in a French harbor, into Brest on 3 December. However, Cushing departed for the United States on 21 December, arriving in New York on 6 January 1919. She was placed in reduced commission on 1 July, and transferred to the Philadelphia Navy Yard on 6 April 1920. In July, she was assigned the hull code of DD-55 under the U.S. Navy's alphanumeric classification system. Cushing was decommissioned on 7 August.

On 1 July 1933, she dropped the name Cushing to free it for a new destroyer of the same name, becoming known only as DD-55. The ship was struck from the Naval Vessel Register on 7 January 1936, and, on 30 June, was sold for scrapping in accordance with the London Naval Treaty for the limitation of naval armaments.

Notes

References

Bibliography

External links 
 

 

O'Brien-class destroyers
Ships built in Quincy, Massachusetts
1915 ships
World War I destroyers of the United States